Sordzha (also, Shordzha) is a village in the Aghjabadi Rayon of Azerbaijan.

References 

Populated places in Aghjabadi District